Eksara is a census town in Bally Jagachha CD Block of Howrah Sadar subdivision in Howrah district in the Indian state of West Bengal. It is a part of Kolkata Urban Agglomeration.

Eksara is under the jurisdiction of Liluah Police Station of Howrah City Police.

Geography

Demographics
As per 2011 Census of India Eksara had a total population of 7,500 of which 3,834 (51%) were males and 3,666 (49%) were females. Population below 6 years was 941. The total number of literates in Eksara was 5,197 (79.23% of the population over 6 years).

 India census, Eksara had a population of 6,485. Males constitute 52% of the population and females 48%. Eksara has an average literacy rate of 66%, higher than the national average of 59.5%: male literacy is 68% and female literacy is 64%. In Eksara, 13% of the population is under 6 years of age.

Transport
Benaras Road (part of State Highway 15) is the artery of the town.

Bus

Private Bus
 57A Chanditala - Howrah Station

Mini Bus
 30 Baluhati - Esplanade

Train
Kona railway station is the nearest railway station on Howrah-Amta line.

References

Cities and towns in Howrah district
Neighbourhoods in Kolkata
Kolkata Metropolitan Area